Dainichigawa Dam  is a gravity dam located in Hyogo Prefecture in Japan. The dam is used for irrigation. The dam impounds about 16  ha of land when full and can store 2099 thousand cubic meters of water. The construction of the dam was completed in 1966.

See also
List of dams in Japan

References

Dams in Hyogo Prefecture